Olantigh is an English house  north of Wye in the civil parish of Wye with Hinxhill.

Garden features include a wide variety of trees with woodland walks; rockerys, shrubbery, herbaceous borders and extensive lawns.

History

The igh in the latter part of the name Olantigh often refers to islands, possibly a reference to the original dwelling being in the vicinity of an isle set in the River Stour. Alternatively, it has been proposed "Olentege" is Old English for "Holy Mount".

During Julius Caesar's 54 BC invasion of England he established a camp on the River Stour near to the present Olantigh. His forces faced several sharp  skirmishe with British forces attacking from their stronghold at Challock Wood.

Kempe

The first known holder of the manor of Olantigh was Sir Norman Kempe (–1295). Notable Kempes to live at Olantigh included John Kemp (1380–1454), Archbishop of Canterbury, and his nephew Thomas Kempe (died 1489), Bishop of London. Sir Thomas Kemp rebuilt the house in 1508.

Thornhill

When Sir Thomas Kempe died  without a son, Olantigh was sold to Sir Timothy Thornhill. In 1679 John Locke spent some time in residence as doctor for Caleb Banks, son of Sir John Banks,  then a tenant there of Sir Timothy's stepson Henry Thornhill (died 1689).

Royalist Colonel Richard Thornhill, the grandson of Timothy Thornhill, and husband of Lady Joanna Thornhill was described as chief agent in Kent of the 1655 Sealed Knot Penruddock uprising. As a result of his resistance to the Commonwealth, in 1706 he was fined as a Delinquent by Parliament and allegedly became hopelessly involved in drinking and gambling. Eventually, and after much obstruction on his part, he obtained Parliamentary permission to appoint trustees that would sell the  estate and pay his debts.

Following the Stuart Restoration Lady Thornhill joined her brother in Whitehall Palace and became a Woman of the Bedchamber to Catherine of Braganza

Sawbridge

Olantigh was purchased in 1720 by Jacob Sawbridge, a director of the South Sea Company though his position was subsequently reduced by its crash. Daniel Defoe described him as one of the three capital sharpers of Britain. He was expelled from the parliamentary pocket borough of Cricklade with his property forfeit by Parliament in order to compensate victims of his schemes. Nevertheless he held on to his home at Olantigh until death in 1748.

Jacob's grand-daughter, the whig, republican historian, Catharine Macaulay, (1731–1791) was born and brought up at the house.

Jacob's son John built his finances through two marriages to wealthy brides and refaced the front of the 1508 building.

John's son John Sawbridge again increased the family's fortunes through advantageous marriages, and substantially extended the Olantigh mansion. His additions included the massive Georgian stone portico and pediment. He became Lord Mayor of London in 1773.

According to Hasted, by 1798 Sawbrige's Olantigh estate encompassed half of the Wye parish including Wye Court, Harville, Coldharbour, Fanns Wood, Wye Downs and Naccolt. The Gentleman's Magazine in 1795 described his home as the magnificent seat of Olantigh, but that would just be a starting point for his grandson.

Zenith

The estate passed down to John Samuel Wanley Sawbridge, (1800–1887) on his father's death in 1851. The son was Member of Parliament for Wareham 1841–57, 1859–65 and 1868–80 without a single statement recorded in Hansard.

On 1 May 1827 he married Jane Frances Erle-Drax Grosvenor at St George's Church, Hanover Square, London. After the 1828 death of her brother, his wife's fortune included Charborough House and Ellerton Abbey estates, as well as sugar plantations in Barbados and Jamaica. Sawbridge then appended his wife's family name of Erle-Drax to his own though commonly referred to by the much shorter nickname The Mad Major, or less kindly as The Wicked Squire.

Following abolition of slavery, Erle-Drax received £4,293 12s 6d compensation in 1836 for the 189 slaves he had to free.
 
Erle-Drax's passion was building. To reflect this new grandeur the extended house was renamed Olantigh Towers. Galleries were laden with Italian Renaissance paintings, and other works, from artists including Ruisdael, Lorain, Bugiardini, Fidanza, Aspertini, Raphael, Bertucci and Melone.

Landscape works included widening a canalised branch taken off the river in order to form an ornamental lake with island, and to the east of Olantigh Road extensive parkland and a  circular walled kitchen garden.

By 1878, Olantigh was particularly noted for its statuary. Erle-Drax had an equestrian statue of himself erected in front of the house's grand portico and stags, the Erle-Drax mascots, were placed prominently. He purchased the Hubert Fountain

Fire

In December 1903, Olantigh was owned by The Mad Major's nephew, Wanley Elias Sawbridge Erle-Drax, vicar of Almer, Dorset, when fire gutted the Georgian mansion. He only escaped by climbing down ivy on the exterior walls clutching his wife's portrait and jewellery.

The cause had been a chimney fire in the dining room. A fire engine was summoned by bicycle and Ashford's horse drawn steam pumper responded, drawing water from the ornamental lake, but much of the house was devastated; the roof collapsed. Many priceless objects including paintings, sculpture and carvings were lost, including a malachite vase which Queen Victoria once wished to purchase. Fortunately the picture gallery was saved by an iron door and the family's archives survived.

The household temporarily moved to nearby Withersdane Hall which had been added to Olantigh's estate in 1867.

In 1910, Erle-Drax commissioned architects A. Barnett Brown and Ernest Barrow to design a new house incorporating the original stone portico. The footprint was moved, with the portico  from its original position, and the smaller scale, red-brick mansion was finished in 1911. The architects were best known for maintenance on masonic premises and this is an unusual example of a completed residence amongst their work.

Hubert Fountain

In 1912, an ornate cast iron fountain and pair of large stag statues at Olantigh were sold to Ashford Urban District Council Chairman, George Harper and removed to Ashford's municipal Victoria Park. The stags were salvaged for scrap in World War II but , the Hubert Fountain survives and is Grade II* listed.

It had originally been displayed at the Great Exhibition of 1862, one of a pair at the entrance to the Royal Horticultural Society's  gardens at South Kensington. John Samuel Wanley Sawbridge Erle-Drax bought the fountain for £3,000 and moved it to Olantigh.

The other fountain of the pair was acquired by Daniel Ross; transported to Edinburgh, and now stands on Princes Street as the Ross Fountain.

Tragically Harper committed suicide, three weeks after donating the fountain, placing his head on a railway track by Ashford Warren ahead of an express train.

Loudon

In 1912, the house was let to John Hope Loudon, who redeveloped the gardens and partially filled in the ornamental lake to form water and bog gardens. His son, Francis William Hope Loudon, purchased Olantigh in 1935. The Erle-Drax family sold by auction some of the furniture they had left there. After World War II, the dwelling proved too large, and the, former picture gallery, west wing which provided two-thirds of the accommodation was demolished in the mid-1950s, leaving a house today only a fifth as large as pre 1903 fire.

The Engineer's November 1921 edition featured a novel sewage treatment and aeration system installed at Olantigh Towers. The arrangement devised by a former lecturer at the nearby South Eastern Agricultural College fed water from a weir on the River Stour to a turbine that powered chain pumps and blowers. The article claimed a reduction in odour and land required relative to traditional techniques.

From 1964 to 1977, Olantigh hosted Alfred Deller's intimate salon, Stour Music Festival. Performers that participated included Deller,  his son Mark, Maurice Bevan and Concentus Musicus.

Alex Loudon (born 1980), from Olantigh, has played cricket for Kent and Warwickshire.

The great storm of 1987 caused catastrophic damage to established gardens and woodland at Olantigh.

Description

In popular culture

Author Russell Hoban may have repurposed Olantigh as "The Aulders" in his 1980, post apocalyptic novel Riddley Walker. Wye became "How"; Withersdane, "Widders Dump", and Ashford "Bernt Arse".

References

External links

Houses completed in 1911
1911 establishments in England
Borough of Ashford
Country houses in Kent
Gardens in Kent
Grade II listed buildings in Kent